Rytidosperma pumilum, also known as feldmark grass, is a species of grass in the family Poaceae.  It is found in Australia and New Zealand.

Description
Feldmark grass is a small and inconspicuous tufted bunchgrass, with its leaves growing to about 3 cm in height, and its flowering stems to about 7 cm.  The leaves have broad, papery sheaths which are often curved or twisted spirally. The two to four spikelets are held against the flowering stem, with each containing two to four flowers.

Distribution and habitat
In Australia feldmark grass has a very restricted occurrence, being limited to about 3 ha of the Main Range of Kosciuszko National Park between Mount Lee and Mount Northcote.  It also occurs in alpine parts of New Zealand.  It is found only in feldmark communities, which are subject to freezing conditions and severe winds.

Conservation status
Feldmark grass is listed as being Vulnerable under Australia's Environment Protection and Biodiversity Conservation Act 1999.

References

Notes

Sources
 
 
 

pumilum
Bunchgrasses of Australasia
Grasses of New Zealand
Flora of New South Wales
Poales of Australia